Cambridge Public School is a highschool in Kikkeri, Mandya district, Karnataka state, India.

Location
Cambridge Public School is located on the bank of the smaller lake in Kikkeri town, K.R.Pet Taluk, Mandya district, Karnataka state, India.

Academics
The school runs grades from 1st to 10th.

Affiliation
Cambridge Public School is affiliated to Karnataka Secondary Education Examination Board.

Facilities
The school has hostel facility and transport facility.  The school is located on a scenic lakeside.

Image gallery

See also
 Kikkeri
 Krishnarajpet
 Education in Karnataka
 Education in India

References

External links

Schools in Mandya district
Educational institutions established in 2003
2003 establishments in Karnataka